Tingo River is located in the Cajamarca Region of Peru. It flows north from near Cerro de Pasco to the Huallaga River. It is classified as hydrographic (river, creek, etc.)

References

Rivers of Peru